Mexican singer-songwriter Paulina Rubio has released eleven studio albums, fifteen compilation albums, 62 singles (including nine as featured artist), ten promotional singles, and has made some eleven guest appearances. In 1992, Rubio signed a recording contract with record label Capitol Latin (EMI Music) in order to launch her career as a solo artist, after recording ten albums with Timbiriche between 1982 and 1990.

Rubio made her debut in August 1992 with "Mío", which was followed by the release of her debut studio album, La Chica Dorada (1992). The record figured on the Mexican Albums Chart and the US Billboard Top Latin Albums and Latin Pop Albums, being later certified platinum in Mexico. The singer's second studio album, 24 Kilates, was made available for consumption on November 16, 1993. The lead single, "Nieva, Nieva" was her third number-one single in Mexico. In March 1995, the singer's third album, El Tiempo Es Oro, spawned the hit "Te Daría Mi Vida", which had been pointed out by music critics for being a musical departure from her previous material and sold 140,000 copies between the United States and Mexico. Rubio released her fourth studio album and last under the EMI Music record label, Planeta Paulina, in September 1996, which featured "Siempre Tuya Desde La Raíz" — a dance-pop oriented tune that  incorporates elements of techno, house and disco sounds — and "Enamorada", which earned Rubio credibility among critics as songwriter and music producer.

Following experimentation with different musical genres through 2000, Rubio's Paulina was released in May of the same year through record label Universal Music Group, and became the fastest-selling record ever by a female act in Mexico, bringing sales of three million units and certified diamond. Unlike all of the singer's previous records, Paulina was promoted through international magazine interviews, talk-show appearances or televised performances in Italy, United Kingdom and Germany, and was accompanied by a supporting world tour as well. It spawned five number-one singles ("Lo Haré Por Ti", "El Último Adiós", "Y Yo Sigo Aquí", "Yo No Soy Esa Mujer" and "Vive El Verano"). With the release of her sixth studio album and only English-language album, Border Girl (2002), Rubio became the only Mexican female act certified gold by the Recording Industry Association of America (RIAA) in the United States. The album featured commercially successful international hits like "I'll Be Right Here (Sexual Lover)" and "Don't Say Goodbye". In 2004, she released the song "Te Quise Tanto", which gave her her first number-one song in the Billboard Hot Latin Songs chart. The track was included on her seventh studio album, Pau-Latina, which reached number one in the US, and became her first album to yield four top-ten hits in the US Latin chart, with "Algo Tienes", "Dame Otro Tequila" and "Mía".

Rubio's eighth studio album, Ananda, was released in 2006. Receiving positive reviews from music critics, it experienced commercial success, although it was the lowest-selling record of her career in Europe. The album including the hit single "Ni Una Sola Palabra", which was a success in Finland and Spain. Rubio began working on her ninth studio album in 2008; Gran City Pop was released in 2009 and received positive reviews from music critics. The album debuted at number two on the US Billboard Top Latin Albums chart and number one on the Latin Pop Albums chart, and spawned the hit singles "Causa y Efecto" and "Ni Rosas Ni Juguetes", which did well in Latin America. Rubio's tenth album, Brava!, was released in 2011 and in 2012 was reissued as Bravísima! It generated the singles "Me Gustas Tanto", which became her fifth number-one song on Billboard Hot Latin Songs, and "Boys Will Be Boys", which was a hit in Spain. Following participation in several talent shows like The X Factor and La Voz, Rubio's eleventh studio album, Deseo, was released in September 2018. Unlike all of the singer's previous records, it not was a success. The lead single "Mi Nuevo Vicio" was number one in Mexico and Spain and certified gold and double platinum.

By 2016, Rubio had sold 1.4 million albums in the United States, according to Nielsen SoundScan and has sold over 15 million copies worldwide, making her one of the best-selling Latin music artists of all time.

Albums

Studio albums

Compilation albums

Box sets 
{| class="wikitable plainrowheaders" style="text-align:center;"
|+ List of box sets, with details
! scope="col" style="width:12em;"| Title
! scope="col" style="width:18em;"| Album details
|-
! scope="row" | 30 Éxitos Insuperables
|
 Released: April 1, 2003
 Label: EMI Music
 Format: CD
|-
! scope="row" | Original Masters
|
 Released: February 15, 2005
 Label: EMI Music
 Format: CD
|-
! scope="row" | 40 Éxitos
|
 Released: 2005
 Label: EMI Music
 Format: CD
|-
! scope="row" | Gran Pop Hits
|
 Released: 2009
 Label: EMI Music
 Format: CD, DVD
|-
! scope="row" | 2 en 1: Pau-Latina/Paulina'
|
 Released: February 17, 2017
 Label: Universal Music
 Format: CD
|}

Extended plays

Singles
 1990s 

2000s

2010s

2020s

Footnotes

Notes for peak chart positions

 As featured artist 

 Promotional singles 

Other appearances

See also
 Paulina Rubio videography
 List of best-selling albums in Mexico

Timbiriche discography
Albums where Paulina Rubio was a band member:
1999: En Concierto 19991998: Timbiriche Clásico1990: Timbiriche X1989: Los Clásicos De Timbiriche1988: Timbiriche VIII & IX1987: Timbiriche VII1985: Timbiriche Rock Show1984: Timbiriche Vaselina1983: Que No Acabe Navidad1983: Disco Ruido1983: En Concierto1982: La Banda Timbiriche1982: Timbiriche''

References

Rubio, Paulina
Rubio, Paulina